The Inyo Mountains are a short mountain range east of the Sierra Nevada in eastern California in the United States.

Geologically, the mountains are a fault block range in the Basin and Range Province, at the western end of the Great Basin.  They are considered to be among the most important and best-known Late Proterozoic to Cambrian sections in the United States.

Wilderness 
Most of the mountain range is designated as the Inyo Mountain Wilderness, managed by the Bureau of Land Management in the south and the United States Forest Service in the north. The USFS manages  of the wilderness all within Inyo National Forest.

Wildlife in the area includes the endangered Inyo Mountains salamander and the desert bighorn sheep. Plant communities include creosote and sagebrush at lower altitudes, and bristlecone pine forests at higher altitudes. A number of rare and endemic plants are adapted to the unique limestone soils of the mountains, including the cliffdweller, bristlecone cryptantha, and Inyo rock daisy.

References

External links 
Inyo Mountain Wilderness - BLM

 
Mountain ranges of Inyo County, California
Mountain ranges of the Mojave Desert
California placenames of Native American origin
Inyo National Forest
Owens Valley